Bangalaia babaulti is a species of beetle in the family Cerambycidae. It was described by Villiers in 1942. It is known from the Democratic Republic of the Congo.

References

Prosopocerini
Beetles described in 1942
Endemic fauna of the Democratic Republic of the Congo